Lorgen is a surname. Notable people with this surname include:

 Snorre Lorgen (born 1969), Norwegian rower
 Sverke Lorgen (born 1973), Norwegian rower

See also
 Loren